Stadion Birchhölzli is a football's stadium in Düdingen, Switzerland. It is the home ground of SC Düdingen and has a capacity of 1,500.

References
https://www.thefinalball.com/estadio.php?id=7956
http://www.soccerway.com/teams/switzerland/sc-dudingen/venue/

See also
List of football stadiums in Switzerland

Birchholzli